Cheongsin Low is a nationally well-known Malaysian calligrapher and stone engraver born in Selangor in 1973. He is one of only four hundred members of the Xiling Seal Art Society, one of the most important Chinese arts organisations, and the only international member from Malaysia.

References

Malaysian artists
1973 births
Living people